Audrey Maxine Hefford (1929 – 5 March 2014) was an Australian international lawn bowler.

Bowls career
Audrey was part of the fours team that won a silver medal at the 1986 Commonwealth Games in Edinburgh. Four years later she just missed out on a bronze medal in the singles at the 1990 Commonwealth Games.

She made her debut for Australia in 1983 and represented South Australia from 1975-1999. She was inducted into the Bowls Australia Hall of Fame. 

She also won a gold and bronze medal at the 1989 Asia Pacific Bowls Championships in Suva, Fiji.

References 

Australian female bowls players
1929 births
2014 deaths
Commonwealth Games silver medallists for Australia
Commonwealth Games medallists in lawn bowls
Bowls players at the 1986 Commonwealth Games
Bowls players at the 1990 Commonwealth Games
20th-century Australian women
21st-century Australian women
Medallists at the 1986 Commonwealth Games